Provability or provable (and disprovability or disprovable) may refer to:

 Provability logic, a modal logic
 Provable prime, an integer that has been calculated to be prime
 Provable security, computer system security that can be proved
 Provably correct, correctness of an algorithm that can be proved
 Provably total, function that can be proven to be computable

See also 
 Proof (disambiguation)
 Proof theory, a branch of mathematical logic
 Recursively enumerable set, also known as provable set